Nohemí Ludivina Menchaca Castellanos (born 20 March 1963) is a Mexican politician affiliated with the PVEM. As of 2013 she served as Senator of the LX and LXI Legislatures of the Mexican Congress representing Quintana Roo.

References

1963 births
Living people
Politicians from Coahuila
Women members of the Senate of the Republic (Mexico)
Members of the Senate of the Republic (Mexico)
Ecologist Green Party of Mexico politicians
21st-century Mexican politicians
21st-century Mexican women politicians
People from San Buenaventura, Coahuila
Universidad Regiomontana alumni